Everybody Wants to Shag... The Teardrop Explodes was the third and final studio album by neo-psychedelic Liverpool band The Teardrop Explodes. When the band reconvened to record their third album, they were reduced to the trio of Cope, Dwyer and a reinstated Balfe.

Tensions were high – Cope wanted to write ballads and quirky pop songs, while Balfe was more interested in recording synth-based dance music. Cope eventually dissolved the band in the middle of the sessions. The material was later released in 1990. Cope re-recorded "Metranil Vavin" and "Pussyface" for his solo album World Shut Your Mouth. After release in 1990, some journalists commented that the music, recorded in 1982, seemed to prefigure the acid house boom at the end of the 1980s, with quirky keyboards, sound effects and odd rhythm tracks.

Track listing
All tracks composed by Julian Cope and David Balfe; except where indicated
 "Ouch Monkeys" - 5:31
 "Serious Danger" - 3:33
 "Metranil Vavin" (Cope) - 3:09
 "Count to Ten and Run for Cover" - 3:23
 "In-Psychlopaedia" (Cope, Gary Dwyer, Balfe) - 4:03
 "Soft Enough for You" - 3:32
 "You Disappear from View" (Cope) - 2:57
 "The Challenger" - 3:00
 "Not My Only Friend" (Cope) - 2:57
 "Sex (Pussyface)" (Cope) - 4:12
 "Terrorist" (Balfe) - 3:34
 "Strange House in the Snow" (1981 B-side of "Reward") - 4:43

Personnel
The Teardrop Explodes
Julian Cope - vocals, bass, violin on "Strange House in the Snow", piano on "Sex" and "Not My Only Friend"
David Balfe - organ, piano, synthesizer, arrangements
Gary Dwyer - drums, drum machine
with:
Troy Tate - guitar on "You Disappear From View"
Alan Gill - guitar on "Strange House In The Snow"
Ron François - bass guitar on "Ouch Monkeys", "Sex" and "You Disappear from View"
Luke Tunney - trumpet on "You Disappear from View" and "Count to Ten and Run for Cover"
Ted Emmet - trumpet on "You Disappear from View" and "Count to Ten and Run for Cover"
Technical
Hugh Jones - engineer
Chris Hughes, Chris Sheldon, Clive Langer, Hugh Jones, Ross Cullum - mixing
Pointblanc Design - artwork

References

1990 albums
The Teardrop Explodes albums
Albums produced by Hugh Jones (producer)
Fontana Records albums